Christopher was the commander-in-chief (Domestic of the Schools) of the Byzantine army during the 870s, and scored significant victories against the Paulicians.

Biography
Nothing is known of Christopher's origin, date of birth or death. He is identified in the sources as the gambros of Emperor Basil I the Macedonian (r. 867–886), a word which usually means "son-in-law", but can imply a more general family tie through marriage. Cyril Mango suggested that Christopher married Basil's eldest daughter, Anastasia, but all the emperor's daughters were eventually confined to a convent.

In 872 or 878/9, Christopher led an expedition against the Paulicians of Tephrike, comprising the forces of the Charsianon and Armeniakon themes. The campaign culminated in the Battle of Bathys Ryax, which saw a crushing defeat of the Paulicians and the death of their leader, Chrysocheir. This success was followed, whether immediately afterwards or a few years later, by the sack of the Paulician capital, Tephrike, and the extinction of their state.

References

Sources

 

9th-century Byzantine people
Domestics of the Schools